Cessford may refer to:

Cessford, Alberta, a hamlet in Alberta, Canada
Cessford, Scottish Borders, a hamlet in Scotland
Cessford (Eastville, Virginia), a historic house in the United States